Adab may refer to:

 Places
 Adab (city), a city of ancient Sumer
 `Adab, a village in Yemen

 Literary and cultural use
 Adab (gesture), a greeting gesture traditionally used by Muslims of South Asia
 Adab (Islam), the category of Islamic law dealing with etiquette
 Adab (literature), the classical Islamic literature of medieval Asia

 Media
 Al Adab, Arabic online literary magazine in Beirut, Lebanon

 Surname
 Misbaholdiwan Adab, a Kurdish poet